Voevodivka, Voievodivka or Voyevodivka may refer to:

 , a village in the Dnipropetrovsk Oblast in Ukraine
 Voevodivka, a village in the Luhansk Oblast in Ukraine